Ceratophyllum is a cosmopolitan genus of flowering plants including four accepted living species in 2016, commonly found in ponds, marshes, and quiet streams in tropical and in temperate regions. It is the only extant genus in the family Ceratophyllaceae, itself the only extant family in the order Ceratophyllales. They are usually called coontails or hornworts, although hornwort is also used for unrelated plants of the division Anthocerotophyta.

Ceratophyllum grows completely submerged, usually, though not always, floating on the surface, and does not tolerate drought. The plant stems can reach 1–3 m in length. At intervals along nodes of the stem they produce rings of bright green leaves, which are narrow and often much-branched. The forked leaves are brittle and stiff to the touch in some species, softer in others. Roots are completely absent and are missing even in the embryonic stage, but sometimes they develop modified leaves with a rootlike appearance, which anchor the plant to the bottom. Also stomata are missing. The flowers are small and inconspicuous, with the male and female flowers on the same plant. In ponds it forms thick buds (turions) in the autumn that sink to the bottom which give the impression that it has been killed by the frost but come spring these will grow back into the long stems slowly filling up the pond.

Taxonomy
Ceratophyllum is considered distinctive enough to warrant its own family, Ceratophyllaceae. It was considered a relative of Nymphaeaceae and included in Nymphaeales in the Cronquist system, but recent research has shown that it is not closely related to Nymphaeaceae or any other extant plant family.  Some early molecular phylogenies suggested it was the sister group to all other angiosperms, but more recent research suggests that it is the sister group to the eudicots.  The APG III system placed the family in its own order, the Ceratophyllales. The APG IV system accepts the phylogeny shown below:

Species
The subgeneric division of the genus Ceratophyllum into its appropriately recognized species, subspecies, and varieties is not settled. More than 30 species have been described and published.  A narrow interpretation of this work rejects over 24 of these taxa as variants, accepting only 6 species.  This narrow interpretation lumps to the point of failing to give these potential species the taxonomic importance of even being named on a subspecific or varietal level. The genus as narrowly defined in this manner contains the following six species:

 Ceratophyllum australe Griseb.
 Ceratophyllum demersum L. (rigid/common hornwort) – cosmopolitan
 Ceratophyllum echinatum A.Gray (spiny hornwort) – North America
 Ceratophyllum muricatum Cham. (prickly hornwort) – Near-cosmopolitan
 Ceratophyllum platyacanthum Cham. – Europe and Asia
 Ceratophyllum submersum L. (soft/tropical hornwort) – Europe, Middle-East, Central Asia, northern and central Africa, Florida, and Dominican Republic
 Ceratophyllum tanaiticum Sapjegin

References

External links

 Ceratophyllaceae of Mongolia in FloraGREIF

 
Angiosperm genera
Freshwater plants